Kerim Zengin (born 13 April 1985) is a Turkish professional footballer who is playing for Karabükspor. He is a youth international, earning caps at levels from the U-17s up to the Turkey national under-21 football team.

Club career
Zengin began his career with local club Mersin İdmanyurdu in 1999. Originally a forward, he spent two years with his hometown club before moving to Istanbul-giants Fenerbahçe. Most of his time with the club was spent either out on loan to clubs such as Mersin İdmanyurdu and İstanbul Büyükşehir Belediyespor, or with the youth teams. He made eight appearances for the club during his six-year tenure. Antalyaspor transferred him in 2009, with Zengin contributing one goal in 19 appearances. He was transferred to Karabükspor the following season. After a one-year spell with Karabükspor, he moved to the league rival Sivasspor.

Honors

Fenerbahçe
Süper Lig: 2006–07

References

External links
 
 
Guardian Stats Centre

1985 births
Living people
Sportspeople from Mersin
Turkish footballers
Turkey under-21 international footballers
Süper Lig players
Mersin İdman Yurdu footballers
Fenerbahçe S.K. footballers
İstanbul Başakşehir F.K. players
Antalyaspor footballers
Kardemir Karabükspor footballers
Sivasspor footballers
Gaziantepspor footballers
Gençlerbirliği S.K. footballers
Akhisarspor footballers
Turkey youth international footballers
Association football defenders